Hansjörg Schneider (born 27 March 1938) is a Swiss writer and dramatist known for occasionally using Mundart or Swiss dialect. He received the Phantastik-Preis der Stadt Wetzlar in 1998.

Filmography 
 2004: Hunkeler: Das Paar im Kahn (TV, based on Schneider's novel of 1999)
 2008: Hunkeler macht Sachen (TV, based on Schneider's 2004 novel)
 2012: Hunkeler und die Augen des Ödipus (TV, based on Schneider's novel of 2010)

References

External links 

Swiss writers in German
Swiss dramatists and playwrights
Male dramatists and playwrights
Swiss male writers
1938 births
Living people
21st-century dramatists and playwrights